Superior Lake may refer to:

 Lake Superior, one of the Great Lakes
 Superior Lake (California)

See also 
 Lake Superior (disambiguation)